Koenigsmark is a 1953 French-Italian drama film directed by Solange Térac and starring Jean-Pierre Aumont, Silvana Pampanini and Renée Faure. It is an adaptation of Pierre Benoît's 1918 novel of the same title. The film's sets were designed by the art director Robert Dumesnil.

Cast
 Jean-Pierre Aumont as Raoul Vignerte  
 Silvana Pampanini as Aurore de Lautenberg 
 Renée Faure as Mélusine de Graffendried  
 Louis Seigner as Cyrus Beck  
 Roldano Lupi as Frédéric de Lautenberg  
 René Sauvaire as Capitaine Hagen  
 Richard Flagey
 Jean-Michel Rankovitch as Un jeune prince 
 Philippe Richard  
 Albert Duvaleix

References

Bibliography 
 Hayward, Susan. French Costume Drama of the 1950s: Fashioning Politics in Film. Intellect Books, 2010.

External links 
 

1953 films
1950s French-language films
Films based on French novels
Films based on works by Pierre Benoit
Films set in Germany
Films set in the 1910s
Italian historical drama films
French historical drama films
1950s historical drama films
Minerva Film films
1953 drama films
French black-and-white films
Italian black-and-white films
1950s Italian films
1950s French films